Nanum is a coastal residential locality in Weipa Town, Far North Queensland, Australia. In the  Nanum had a population of 921 people.

Geography 

Nanum is situated between Trunding and Evans Landing, near the mouth of the Mission River. Approximately half of the land is used for residential housing while the remainder is undeveloped.

Albatross Bay is off the coast to the north-west, part of the Gulf of Carpentaria. Nanum Beach is a sandy strip that extends along most of the Nanum coastline and north into neighbouring Trunding.

History 
Nanum was established in the 1990s as the residential area of Weipa needed to grow southward.

In the 2006 census, Nanum had a population of 728 people.

In the 2011 census, Nanum had a population of 815 people.

In the  Nanum had a population of 921 people.

Education 
There are no schools in Nannum. The nearest primary and secondary school is Western Cape College in Rocky Point to the north-west.

References

Weipa Town
Localities in Queensland